In software design and engineering, the observer pattern is a software design pattern in which an object, named the subject, maintains a list of its dependents, called observers, and notifies them automatically of any state changes, usually by calling one of their methods.

It is often used for implementing distributed event-handling systems in event-driven software. In such systems, the subject is usually named a "stream of events" or "stream source of events" while the observers are called "sinks of events." The stream nomenclature alludes to a physical setup in which the observers are physically separated and have no control over the emitted events from the subject/stream source. This pattern thus suits any process by which data arrives from some input that is not available to the CPU at startup, but instead arrives seemingly at random (HTTP requests, GPIO data, user input from peripherals, distributed databases and blockchains, etc.). 

Most modern programming languages comprise built-in event constructs implementing the observer-pattern components. While not mandatory, most observer implementations use background threads listening for subject events and other support mechanisms provided by the kernel.

Overview
The observer design pattern is a behavioural pattern listed among the 23 well-known "Gang of Four" design patterns that address recurring design challenges in order to design flexible and reusable object-oriented software, yielding objects that are easier to implement, change, test and reuse.

Which problems can the observer design pattern solve?
The observer pattern addresses the following problems:
 A one-to-many dependency between objects should be defined without making the objects tightly coupled. 
 When one object changes state, an open-ended number of dependent objects should be updated automatically.
 An object can notify multiple other objects.

Defining a one-to-many dependency between objects by defining one object (subject) that updates the state of dependent objects directly is inflexible because it couples the subject to particular dependent objects. However, it might be applicable from a performance point of view or if the object implementation is tightly coupled (such as low-level kernel structures that execute thousands of times per second). Tightly coupled objects can be difficult to implement in some scenarios and are not easily reused because they refer to and are aware of many objects with different interfaces. In other scenarios, tightly coupled objects can be a better option because the compiler is able to detect errors at compile time and optimize the code at the CPU instruction level.

What solution does the Observer design pattern describe?
 Define Subject and Observer objects.
 When a subject changes state, all registered observers are notified and updated automatically (and probably asynchronously).

The sole responsibility of a subject is to maintain a list of observers and to notify them of state changes by calling their update() operation. The responsibility of observers is to register and unregister themselves with a subject (in order to be notified of state changes) and to update their state (to synchronize their state with the subject's state) when they are notified. This makes subject and observers loosely coupled. Subject and observers have no explicit knowledge of each other. Observers can be added and removed independently at run time. This notification-registration interaction is also known as publish-subscribe.

Strong vs. weak reference 

The observer pattern can cause memory leaks, known as the lapsed listener problem, because in a basic implementation, it requires both explicit registration and explicit deregistration, as in the dispose pattern, because the subject holds strong references to the observers, keeping them alive. This can be prevented if the subject holds weak references to the observers.

Coupling and typical publish-subscribe implementations 
 
Typically, the observer pattern is implemented so that the subject being observed is part of the object for which state changes are being observed (and communicated to the observers). This type of implementation is considered tightly coupled, forcing both the observers and the subject to be aware of each other and have access to their internal parts, creating possible issues of scalability, speed, message recovery and maintenance (also called event or notification loss), the lack of flexibility in conditional dispersion and possible hindrance to desired security measures. In some (non-polling) implementations of the publish-subscribe pattern, this is solved by creating a dedicated message queue server (and sometimes an extra message handler object) as an extra stage between the observer and the object being observed, thus decoupling the components. In these cases, the message queue server is accessed by the observers with the observer pattern, subscribing to certain messages and knowing (or not knowing, in some cases) about only the expected message, while knowing nothing about the message sender itself; the sender may also know nothing about the observers. Other implementations of the publish-subscribe pattern, which achieve a similar effect of notification and communication to interested parties, do not use the observer pattern. 

In early implementations of multi-window operating systems such as OS/2 and Windows, the terms "publish-subscribe pattern" and "event-driven software development" were used as synonyms for the observer pattern. 

The observer pattern, as described in the Design Patterns book, is a very basic concept and does not address removing interest in changes to the observed subject or special logic to be performed by the observed subject before or after notifying the observers. The pattern also does not deal with recording change notifications or guaranteeing that they are received. These concerns are typically handled in message-queueing systems, in which the observer pattern plays only a small part. 

Related patterns include publish–subscribe, mediator and singleton.

Uncoupled
The observer pattern may be used in the absence of publish-subscribe, as when model status is frequently updated. Frequent updates may cause the view to become unresponsive (e.g., by invoking many repaint calls); such observers should instead use a timer. Instead of becoming overloaded by change message, the observer will cause the view to represent the approximate state of the model at a regular interval. This mode of observer is particularly useful for progress bars, in which the underlying operation's progress changes frequently.

Structure

UML class and sequence diagram

In this UML class diagram, the Subject class does not update the state of dependent objects directly. Instead, Subject refers to the Observer interface (update()) for updating state, which makes the Subject independent of how the state of dependent objects is updated. The Observer1 and Observer2 classes implement the Observer interface by synchronizing their state with subject's state.

The UML sequence diagram shows the runtime interactions: The Observer1 and Observer2 objects call attach(this) on Subject1 to register themselves. Assuming that the state of Subject1 changes, Subject1 calls notify() on itself. notify() calls update() on the registered Observer1 and Observer2objects, which request the changed data (getState()) from Subject1 to update (synchronize) their state.

UML class diagram

Example

While the library classes java.util.Observer and java.util.Observable exist, they have been deprecated in Java 9 because the model implemented was quite limited.

Below is an example written in Java that takes keyboard input and handles each input line as an event. When a string is supplied from System.in, the method notifyObservers() is then called in order to notify all observers of the event's occurrence, in the form of an invocation of their update methods.

Java
import java.util.List;
import java.util.ArrayList;
import java.util.Scanner;

interface Observer {
    void update(String event);
}
  
class EventSource {
    List<Observer> observers = new ArrayList<>();
  
    void notifyObservers(String event) {
        observers.forEach(observer -> observer.update(event));
    }
  
    void addObserver(Observer observer) {
        observers.add(observer);
    }
  
    void scanSystemIn() {
        var scanner = new Scanner(System.in);
        while (scanner.hasNextLine()) {
            String line = scanner.nextLine();
            notifyObservers(line);
        }
    }
}

public class ObserverDemo {
    public static void main(String[] args) {
        System.out.println("Enter Text : ");
        var eventSource = new EventSource();
        
        eventSource.addObserver(event -> {
            System.out.println("Received response: " + event);
        });

        eventSource.scanSystemIn();
    }
}

Groovy
class EventSource {
    private observers = []

    private notifyObservers(String event) {
        observers.each { it(event) }
    }

    void addObserver(observer) {
        observers += observer
    }

    void scanSystemIn() {
        var scanner = new Scanner(System.in)
        while (scanner) {
            var line = scanner.nextLine()
            notifyObservers(line)
        }
    }
}

println 'Enter Text: '
var eventSource = new EventSource()

eventSource.addObserver { event ->
    println "Received response: $event"
}

eventSource.scanSystemIn()

Kotlin
import java.util.Scanner

typealias Observer = (event: String) -> Unit;

class EventSource {
    private var observers = mutableListOf<Observer>()

    private fun notifyObservers(event: String) {
        observers.forEach { it(event) }
    }

    fun addObserver(observer: Observer) {
        observers += observer
    }

    fun scanSystemIn() {
        val scanner = Scanner(System.`in`)
        while (scanner.hasNext()) {
            val line = scanner.nextLine()
            notifyObservers(line)
        }
    }
}
fun main(arg: List<String>) {
    println("Enter Text: ")
    val eventSource = EventSource()

    eventSource.addObserver { event ->
        println("Received response: $event")
    }

    eventSource.scanSystemIn()
}

Delphi
uses
  System.Generics.Collections, System.SysUtils;

type
  IObserver = interface
    ['{0C8F4C5D-1898-4F24-91DA-63F1DD66A692}']
    procedure Update(const AValue: string);
  end;

type
  TObserverManager = class
  private
    FObservers: TList<IObserver>;
  public
    constructor Create; overload;
    destructor Destroy; override;
    procedure NotifyObservers(const AValue: string);
    procedure AddObserver(const AObserver: IObserver);
    procedure UnregisterObsrver(const AObserver: IObserver);
  end;

type
  TListener = class(TInterfacedObject, IObserver)
  private
    FName: string;
  public
    constructor Create(const AName: string); reintroduce;
    procedure Update(const AValue: string);
  end;

procedure TObserverManager.AddObserver(const AObserver: IObserver);
begin
  if not FObservers.Contains(AObserver)
    then FObservers.Add(AObserver);
end;

begin
  FreeAndNil(FObservers);
  inherited;
end;

procedure TObserverManager.NotifyObservers(const AValue: string);
var
  i: Integer;
begin
  for i := 0 to FObservers.Count - 1 do
    FObservers[i].Update(AValue);
end;

procedure TObserverManager.UnregisterObsrver(const AObserver: IObserver);
begin
  if FObservers.Contains(AObserver)
    then FObservers.Remove(AObserver);
end;

constructor TListener.Create(const AName: string);
begin
  inherited Create;
  FName := AName;
end;

procedure TListener.Update(const AValue: string);
begin
  WriteLn(FName + ' listener received notification: ' + AValue);
end;

procedure TMyForm.ObserverExampleButtonClick(Sender: TObject);
var
  LDoorNotify: TObserverManager;
  LListenerHusband: IObserver;
  LListenerWife: IObserver;
begin
  LDoorNotify := TObserverManager.Create;
  try
    LListenerHusband := TListener.Create('Husband');
    LDoorNotify.AddObserver(LListenerHusband);
    LListenerWife := TListener.Create('Wife');
    LDoorNotify.AddObserver(LListenerWife);
    LDoorNotify.NotifyObservers('Someone is knocking on the door');
  finally
    FreeAndNil(LDoorNotify);
  end;
end;

Output
Husband listener received notification: Someone is knocking on the door
Wife listener received notification: Someone is knocking on the door

Python
A similar example in Python:

class Observable:
    def __init__(self):
        self._observers = []

    def register_observer(self, observer):
        self._observers.append(observer)

    def notify_observers(self, *args, **kwargs):
        for obs in self._observers:
            obs.notify(self, *args, **kwargs)

class Observer:
    def __init__(self, observable):
        observable.register_observer(self)

    def notify(self, observable, *args, **kwargs):
        print("Got", args, kwargs, "From", observable)

subject = Observable()
observer = Observer(subject)
subject.notify_observers("test", kw="python")

# prints: Got ('test',) {'kw': 'python'} From <__main__.Observable object at 0x0000019757826FD0>

C#
    public class Payload
    {
        public string Message { get; set; }
    }

    public class Subject : IObservable<Payload>
    {
        public ICollection<IObserver<Payload>> Observers { get; set; }

        public Subject()
        {
            Observers = new List<IObserver<Payload>>();
        }

        public IDisposable Subscribe(IObserver<Payload> observer)
        {         
            if (!Observers.Contains(observer))
            {
                Observers.Add(observer);
            }

            return new Unsubscriber(observer, Observers);
        }

        public void SendMessage(string message)
        {
            foreach (var observer in Observers)
            {
                observer.OnNext(new Payload { Message = message });
            }
        }
    }

    public class Unsubscriber : IDisposable
    {
        private IObserver<Payload> observer;
        private IList<IObserver<Payload>> observers;

        public Unsubscriber(
            IObserver<Payload> observer,
            IList<IObserver<Payload>> observers)
        {
            this.observer = observer;
            this.observers = observers;
        }

        public void Dispose()
        {
            if (observer != null && observers.Contains(observer))
            {
                observers.Remove(observer);
            }
        }
    }

    public class Observer : IObserver<Payload>
    {
        public string Message { get; set; }

        public void OnCompleted()
        {
        }

        public void OnError(Exception error)
        {
        }

        public void OnNext(Payload value)
        {
            Message = value.Message;
        }

        public IDisposable Register(Subject subject)
        {
            return subject.Subscribe(this);
        }
    }

JavaScript

JavaScript has a deprecated  function that was a more accurate implementation of the observer pattern. This would fire events upon change to the observed object. Without the deprecated  function, the pattern may be implemented with more explicit code:

let Subject = {
    _state: 0,
    _observers: [],
    add: function(observer) {
        this._observers.push(observer);
    },
    getState: function() {
        return this._state;
    },
    setState: function(value) {
        this._state = value;
        for (let i = 0; i < this._observers.length; i++)
        {
            this._observers[i].signal(this);
        }
    }
};

let Observer = {
    signal: function(subject) {
        let currentValue = subject.getState();
        console.log(currentValue);
    }
}

Subject.add(Observer);
Subject.setState(10);
//Output in console.log - 10

See also
Implicit invocation
Client–server model
The observer pattern is often used in the entity–component–system pattern

References

External links

Software design patterns
Articles with example Java code
Articles with example Python (programming language) code
Articles with example C Sharp code